The Men's singles event at the 2010 South American Games was held on March 24 at 9:00.

Medalists

Results

References
Report

Singles